Kamiennik is a village in Nysa County, Opole Voivodeship, in south-western Poland. It is the seat of the gmina (administrative district) called Gmina Kamiennik.

The village has a population of 680.

References

Villages in Nysa County